Heinrich Müller (18 October 1631 – 13/23 September 1675) was a German devotional author, Protestant writer of hymns, a Lutheran minister and theologian and a professor at the University of Rostock from 1647 to 1650. He famously denounced the font, the pulpit, the confessional, and the altar as "the four dumb idols of the Lutheran Church". He died in Rostock, aged 43.

Heinrich Müller studied on recommending Johann Quistorp d.Ä. at the University of Greifswald. Afterwards he returned to the domicile of his father Peter Müller and studied in Rostock with professors Caspar Mauritius (? 1677) and August Varenius (1620-1684). The dean of the philosophy faculty, Johann Corfinius, permitted him to give his first lectures. In 1652 he became Archidiakon at St. Marien in Rostock. He became Professor for the Greek language in 1659, for theology in 1662. He was appointed as the minister of St. Marien in 1662, where he became 1671 Superintendent.

Heinrich Müller was considered as dogmatic orthodox and followed the tradition of Martin Luther against church bad states. He was a representative of the Verinnerlichung of the Christianity. His passion lectures were far common and formed the main text collected for Matthäus-Passion (BWV 244) by J.S. Bach. He worked as sacred texts writer and wrote collections of cantatas, which were published under the titles of Geistliche Seelen-Musik and Himmlische Liebesflamme. In his publication of Geistliche Erquickungsstunden (1664-1666) he used the term superhuman in the sense of a God human being for the first time in the German language.

German Lutheran theologians
17th-century German Protestant theologians
Academic staff of the University of Rostock
1631 births
1675 deaths
German Lutheran hymnwriters
German male non-fiction writers
17th-century hymnwriters
Clergy from Lübeck
17th-century German writers
17th-century German male writers

Early modern Christian devotional writers
17th-century Lutheran theologians